Westwood, Washington may refer to:
 Westwood, Bainbridge Island, Washington
 Westwood, Seattle
 Westwood, Washington (King County)